The Carlson Block is a pizza restaurant in a century-old building in Wilkeson, Washington. The sourdough crust pizza, described as "the best in Washington state" by The Seattle Times, is made in a wood-fired oven by chef and owner, Ian Galbraith.  The restaurant opened  early 2017, six years after the owner created the sourdough mother. Galbraith graduated from Fife High School and later attended Culinary Institute of America.

References

External links

2017 establishments in Washington (state)
Companies based in Pierce County, Washington
Pizzerias in the United States
Restaurants in Washington (state)